Green Machine may refer to:

 Greenmachine, a Japanese stoner / doom metal band
 "Green Machine" (song), a song by Kyuss on their album Blues for the Red Sun
 Canberra Raiders, an Australian National Rugby League team
 Danny Green (born 1973), Australian boxer
 Ireland (Australian rules football National Team)
 OLPC XO, a laptop computer
 Michael van Gerwen, a Dutch darts player
 Toronto-Dominion Bank's brand for automated banking machines
 The Cavaliers Drum and Bugle Corps
 "Green Machine", a song by The Apples in Stereo on their album Fun Trick Noisemaker
 The prototype for Hewlett-Packard 9100A, created by Thomas E. Osborne
 Green Machine, a model of tricycle manufactured by Huffy